This is a list of award winners and league leaders for the New York Yankees professional baseball team.

Baseball Hall of Famers

Elected mainly for Yankee service
Ed Barrow, General Manager, 1921–46
Yogi Berra, C-LF, 1946–63; MGR, 1964, 1984–85
Jack Chesbro, P, 1903–09
Earle Combs, CF, 1924–35
Bill Dickey, C, 1928–43, 1946; MGR, 1946
Joe DiMaggio, CF, 1936–42, 1946–51
Whitey Ford, P, 1950, 1953–67
Lou Gehrig, 1B, 1923–39
Lefty Gomez, P, 1930–42
Joe Gordon, 2B 1938-1943, 1946
Rich "Goose" Gossage, P, 1978–1983, 1989
Waite Hoyt, P, 1921–30
Miller Huggins, MGR, 1918–29
Derek Jeter,SS, 1995-2014
Willie Keeler, RF, 1903–09
Tony Lazzeri, 2B, 1926–37
Mickey Mantle, CF, 1951–68
Joe McCarthy, MGR, 1931–46
Herb Pennock, P, 1923–33
Mariano Rivera, P, 1995-2013
Phil Rizzuto, SS, 1941–42, 1946–56
Red Ruffing, P, 1930–42, 1945–46
Babe Ruth, RF, 1920–34
Casey Stengel, MGR, 1949–60
George Weiss, General Manager, 1947–60
Dave Winfield, LF-RF, 1981–88, 1990

Elected for service with other teams, as well as the Yankees
Frank Baker, 3B, 1916–19, 1921–22
Wade Boggs, 3B, 1993–97
Roger Bresnahan, C, 1901–02
Frank Chance, 1B-MGR, 1913–14
Stan Coveleski, P, 1928
Leo Durocher, MGR (2B-SS, 1925, 1928–29)
Clark Griffith, P-MGR, 1903–07
Burleigh Grimes, P, 1934
Bucky Harris, MGR, 1947–48
Rickey Henderson, LF, 1985–89
Catfish Hunter, P, 1975–79
Reggie Jackson, RF, 1977–81*
Joe Kelley, CF, 1902 (Baltimore)
Bob Lemon, MGR, 1978–79, 1981–82
Joe McGinnity, P 1901–02 (Baltimore)
John McGraw, MGR (3B-MGR, 1901–02)
Johnny Mize, 1B, 1949–53
Phil Niekro, P, 1984–85
Gaylord Perry, P, 1980
Wilbert Robinson, C, 1901–02; MGR, 1902 (Baltimore)
Joe Sewell, 3B, 1931–33
Enos Slaughter, LF, 1954–55, 1956–59
Dazzy Vance, P, 1915, 1918
Paul Waner, RF, 1944–45

(Affiliation according to National Baseball Hall of Fame; Reggie Jackson is affiliated with the Athletics, but wears a New York Yankees cap )

Major League Baseball awards

Most Valuable Player

1923 – Babe Ruth
1927 – Lou Gehrig
1936 – Lou Gehrig (2)
1939 – Joe DiMaggio
1941 – Joe DiMaggio (2)
1942 – Joe Gordon
1943 – Spud Chandler
1947 – Joe DiMaggio (3)
1950 – Phil Rizzuto
1951 – Yogi Berra
1954 – Yogi Berra (2)
1955 – Yogi Berra (3)
1956 – Mickey Mantle
1957 – Mickey Mantle (2)
1960 – Roger Maris
1961 – Roger Maris (2)
1962 – Mickey Mantle (3)
1963 – Elston Howard
1976 – Thurman Munson
1985 – Don Mattingly
2005 – Alex Rodriguez (2)
 – Alex Rodriguez (3)
2022 – Aaron Judge

Cy Young
1958 – Bob Turley (MLB)
1961 – Whitey Ford (MLB)
1977 – Sparky Lyle (AL)
1978 – Ron Guidry (AL)
 – Roger Clemens (AL)

Rookie of the Year
1951 – Gil McDougald
1954 – Bob Grim
1957 – Tony Kubek
1962 – Tom Tresh
1968 – Stan Bahnsen
1970 – Thurman Munson
1981 – Dave Righetti
1996 – Derek Jeter
2017 - Aaron Judge

Manager of the Year
See footnote
Buck Showalter (1994)
Joe Torre [2] (1996, tied with Johnny Oates, Texas; 1998)

Gold Glove Award

Platinum Glove Award
Awarded to the best defensive player in each league, as selected by fans from the year's Gold Glove winners.

Jose Trevino (2022)

Wilson Defensive Player of the Year Award

Note: In its first two years, the award was given to a player on each MLB team; one awardee was then named the Overall Defensive Player of the Year for the American League and another for the National League. Starting in 2014, the award is now given to one player at each position for all of Major League Baseball; one of the nine awardees is then named the Overall Defensive Player of the Year for all of Major League Baseball.
Team (all positions)
Robinson Canó (2012, 2013)

Left fielder (in MLB)
Brett Gardner (2016)

Silver Slugger Award

Comeback Player of the Year Award
 – Jason Giambi
 – Mariano Rivera

Hank Aaron Award (top hitter)
Derek Jeter [2] (2006, 2009)
Alex Rodriguez (2007)
Aaron Judge (2022)

Edgar Martínez Award
Don Baylor (1985)

MLB All-Century Team

Pitcher
Roger Clemens
Catcher
Yogi Berra
First Base
Lou Gehrig

Outfield
Joe DiMaggio
Mickey Mantle
Babe Ruth

DHL Hometown Heroes (2006)
Babe Ruth — voted by MLB fans as the most outstanding player in the history of the franchise, based on on-field performance, leadership quality and character value

MLB All-Time Team (Baseball Writers' Association of America)
First base
Lou Gehrig
Right field
Babe Ruth
Manager
Casey Stengel

Sporting News All-Decade Team
See: Sporting News#Major-league baseball awards
Alex Rodriguez, 3B (2009) (also played with Seattle and Texas (2000-2003))
Derek Jeter, SS (2009)
Randy Johnson, SP (2009) (Played with the Yankees from 2005–2006. Also played with Arizona (1999–2004; 2007–2008) and San Francisco (2009))
Mariano Rivera, CP (2009)
Joe Torre, Manager (2009) (Managed the Yankees from 1996–2007. Also managed the Los Angeles Dodgers (2008-2009))

Sports Illustrated MLB All-Decade Team

Alex Rodriguez, 3B (2009) (also played with Seattle and Texas (2000-2003))
Derek Jeter, SS (2009)
Randy Johnson, SP (2009) (Played with the Yankees from 2005–2006. Also played with Arizona (1999–2004; 2007–2008) and San Francisco (2009))
Mariano Rivera, CP (2009)
Joe Torre, Manager (2009) (Managed the Yankees from 1996–2007. Also managed the Los Angeles Dodgers (2008-2009))

USA Today Cy Young
2005 – Mariano Rivera
 – CC Sabathia

Baseball America All-Rookie Team
See: Baseball America#Baseball America All-Rookie Team
2011 – Iván Nova (SP; one of five)

Topps All-Star Rookie teams

Pitchers
Stan Bahnsen (1968)
Brian Fisher (1985)
Dellin Betances & Masahiro Tanaka (2014)
Jordan Montgomery (2017)
Catchers
Thurman Munson (1970)
Bob Geren (1989)
Gary Sánchez (2016)
First basemen
John Ellis (1970)
Nick Johnson (2002)

Second basemen
Willie Randolph (1976)
Alfonso Soriano (2001)
Gleyber Torres (2018)
Third basemen
Bobby Cox (1968)
Miguel Andújar (2018)
Shortstops
Tom Tresh (1962)
Derek Jeter (1996)
Outfielders
Melky Cabrera (2006)
Aaron Judge (2017)

Babe Ruth Award (postseason MVP)

Note: Before 2007, the award was exclusively for performances in the World Series.
Joe Page (1949)
Jerry Coleman (1950)
Phil Rizzuto (1951)
Johnny Mize (1952)
Billy Martin (1953)
Don Larsen (1956)
Elston Howard (1958)
Whitey Ford (1961)
Ralph Terry (1962)
Reggie Jackson (1977)
Bucky Dent (1978)
Cecil Fielder (1996)
Scott Brosius (1998)
Mariano Rivera (1999, 2003)
Derek Jeter (2000)
Alex Rodriguez (2009)

MLB Insiders Club Magazine All-Postseason Team
2011 – Robinson Canó (2B)

Lou Gehrig Memorial Award

Gil McDougald (1958)
Bobby Richardson (1963)
Tommy John (1981)
Don Mattingly (1993)
Derek Jeter (2010)

MLB All-Time Manager
See: Major League Baseball All-Time Team (1997; BBWAA)
Casey Stengel

Sporting News Manager of the Decade
See: 
Joe Torre (also managed the Los Angeles Dodgers, 2008-09)

Sports Illustrated MLB Manager of the Decade

Joe Torre (2009) (also managed the Los Angeles Dodgers, 2008-09)

The Sporting News Manager of the Year
Note: Established in 1936, this award was given annually to one manager in Major League Baseball. In 1986 it was expanded to honor one manager from each league.
See footnote

1936 – Joe McCarthy
1938 – Joe McCarthy
1943 – Joe McCarthy
1947 – Bucky Harris
1949 – Casey Stengel
1953 – Casey Stengel
1958 – Casey Stengel
1961 – Ralph Houk
1974 – Bill Virdon
1994 – Buck Showalter
1998 – Joe Torre

Associated Press Manager of the Year Award
See: Associated Press#AP sports awards
Note: Discontinued in 2001. From 1959 to 1983, the award was given annually to one manager in each league. From 1984 to 2000, the award was given to one manager in all of Major League Baseball.
See footnote
1963 – Ralph Houk
1970 – Ralph Houk
1976 – Billy Martin
1978 – Bob Lemon (Also managed the Chicago White Sox in 1978)
1998 – Joe Torre

Ford C. Frick Award recipients (broadcasters)
See "Ford C. Frick Award recipients" at

Team awards

Team championships and recognitions

1976 – William Harridge Trophy (American League champion)
 – World Series Trophy
 – World Series Trophy
 – William Harridge Trophy (American League champion)
 – Commissioner's Trophy (World Series)
1997 (1996 New York Yankees) – Outstanding Team ESPY Award
 – Commissioner's Trophy (World Series)
1998 – Baseball America Organization of the Year
 – Commissioner's Trophy (World Series)
1999 (1998 New York Yankees) – Outstanding Team ESPY Award
1999 – Sporting News Sportsman of the Year
1999 (1927 Yankees) – "ESPN" Number 1 greatest sports team (in 20th century, of the 4 major North American sports leagues)
 1999 (1939 Yankees) – "ESPN" Number 6 greatest sports team (in 20th century, of the 4 major North American sports leagues)
 – Commissioner's Trophy (World Series)
2001 (2000 New York Yankees) – Outstanding Team ESPY Award
 – William Harridge Trophy (American League champion)
2003 – William Harridge Trophy (American League champion)
 – Commissioner's Trophy (World Series)
 – Sports Illustrated MLB Top Single-Season Team of the Decade (2009 Yankees)
2009 – Sports Illustrated Best MLB Franchise of the Decade

Team records (single-game, single-season, career)

Other achievements

Monument Park

Retired numbers
See New York Yankees#Retired numbers

James P. Dawson Award
The James P. Dawson Award is given at the end of spring training to the best rookie.

New York BBWAA chapter awards
See: New York BBWAA chapter awards

Sid Mercer–Dick Young Player of the Year Award

Arthur and Milton Richman "You Gotta Have Heart" Award

Joan Payson Award
Note: The award is for excellence in community service.

Casey Stengel "You Can Look It Up" Award
Note: The award is to honor career achievement for those who went home empty-handed at previous dinners.

Joe DiMaggio "Toast of the Town" Award
The awards is for a player who has become a New York favorite.

William J. Slocum–Jack Lang Award
Note: The award is for long and meritorious service.

Ben Epstein–Dan Castellano "Good Guy" Award
Note: The award is for candor and accessibility to writers.

Willie, Mickey and the Duke Award
Note: The award is given to a group of players forever linked in baseball history.

World Baseball Classic MVP
 – Robinson Canó (2B)

Associated Press Athlete of the Year

1941 – Joe DiMaggio
1956 – Mickey Mantle
1961 – Roger Maris
1978 – Ron Guidry

Hickok Belt
Note: The Hickok Belt trophy was originally awarded to the top professional athlete of the year in the U.S., from 1950 to 1976. It was then revived and has been awarded since 2012.
1950 – Phil Rizzuto
1951 – Allie Reynolds
1956 – Mickey Mantle
1958 – Bob Turley
1961 – Roger Maris

Sporting News Sportsman of the Year
See: Sporting News#Sportsman of the Year
1978 – Ron Guidry
1996 – Joe Torre
1999 – New York Yankees

Sporting News Pro Athlete of the Year
See: Sporting News#Pro Athlete of the Year
 – Mariano Rivera

Sports Illustrated Sportsman of the Year

2009 – Derek Jeter

Sports Illustrated Top 20 Male Athletes of the Decade
See: List of 2009 all-decade Sports Illustrated awards and honors#Top 20 Male Athletes of the Decade
2009 – Mariano Rivera (#11)
2009 – Derek Jeter (#18)
2009 – Alex Rodriguez (#20)

Sports Illustrated Top 10 Coaches/Managers of the Decade (2009)
See: List of 2009 all-decade Sports Illustrated awards and honors#Top 10 Coaches/Managers of the Decade
No. 3 – Joe Torre, Yankees–Dodgers (the list's only other MLB manager was Boston's Terry Francona, No. 4)

Best Coach/Manager ESPY Award

Joe Torre (1997, 1999, 2000, 2001)

Minor-league system

Baseball America Minor League Player of the Year Award
Derek Jeter, 1994

MiLB George M. Trautman Award / Topps Player of the Year

 – Shelley Duncan (International League; Scranton/Wilkes-Barre; OF) & Austin Romine (Florida State League; Tampa; C)

Kevin Lawn Awards
The Kevin Lawn Awards are given annually to the best minor league baseball player and pitcher in the Yankees' organization.

See also
New York Yankees Museum
Baseball awards
List of MLB awards

Footnotes

Award
Major League Baseball team trophies and awards